This is a list of women photographers who were born in Japan or whose works are closely associated with that country.

A 

 Emi Anrakuji (born 1963) legally blind photographer known for her portraits

F
 Shiho Fukada (fl 2000s), photojournalist

H
 Mikiko Hara (born 1967), colour snapshots of people or things in everyday life, often causing feelings of levity or foreboding, people in public spaces
 Hiromix (born 1976), life from a teenager's perspective and photo books on identity, community, gender and the everyday

I
 Hisae Imai (1931–2009), specialized in the photography of horses 
Ariko Inaoka (active since 1998), photographer
 Miyako Ishiuchi (born 1947), contrasty prints including close-ups of the very old, grainy-blurry works, close-ups of the elderly

K
 Mari Katayama (born 1987), self-portraits with textile sculptures
 Rinko Kawauchi (born 1972), serene, poetic style, ordinary moments in life
Aya Kida (born 1974), photographer, winner of the Kimura Ihei Award
 Fusako Kodama (born 1945), depicted Japan as a nation of high technology, and life in Tokyo
 Michiko Kon (born 1955), new approach to mainly black-and-white still lifes with images of everything from toothbrushes to timepieces and fish parts black and white prints, sea creatures
Yasuko Kotani (born 1962), photographer

M
 Miyuki Matsuda (born 1961), an actor who has published photography of nudes
 Michiko Matsumoto (born 1950), portraits of artists and dancers living in various countries
Tomoko Miyamoto (born 1960), photographer

N
 Yurie Nagashima (born 1973), portraits, including portraits of herself and her family in the nude, street photography, still lifes
 Mika Ninagawa (born 1972), brightly coloured photographs of flowers, goldfish and landscapes, commercially successful in fashion and advertising
 Rika Noguchi (born 1971), landscape photographer, artistic photographer, based in Berlin

O
 Yoshino Ōishi (born 1944), widely travelled photojournalist, educator
 Yuki Onodera (born 1962), images of everyday objects such as old clothes, tin cans, birds, houses shining in the darkness, and human figures, living in France
 Kei Orihara (born 1948), documentary and portrait photographer, has published books on life in New York, and books for children about the disabled, interior portraits, photobooks for children

S
 Tsuneko Sasamoto (1914–2022), Japan's first female photojournalist, has photographed some of the country's greatest personalities and historic moments  
Tomoko Sawada (born 1977), feminist photographer, performance artist
 Shima Ryū (1823–1899), earliest known Japanese woman photographer, photographed her husband in 1864, later opened a studio in Kiryū
 Mieko Shiomi (1909–1984), abstraction and realism, known for her monochrome compositions
 Kunié Sugiura (born 1942), creator of photograms, based in New York City
Ryoko Suzuki (born 1970), photographic artist

T
 Cozue Takagi (born 1985), creator of montages
 Toyoko Tokiwa (1928–2019), best known for her depiction of the red-light district of post-occupation Yokohama, for a clientele of US servicemen
 Tokuko Ushioda (born 1940), widely exhibited freelance photographer

W
 Hitomi Watanabe (渡辺 眸 Watanabe Hitomi, born 1939)

Y
 Eiko Yamazawa (1899–1995), portrait photographer and founder of a photography school, own studio
 Miwa Yanagi (born 1967), staged events with women of various ages, frequently using the computer to alter the image in strange ways, several published series including Elevator Girls
 Shizuka Yokomizo (born 1966), photographer and installation artist based in London
 Ruiko Yoshida (born 1938), has published several photobooks designed to fight against discrimination towards the poor and blacks, best known for Harlem Black Angels

See also
List of women photographers

References

-
Japanese women photographers, List of
Photographers
Photographers